Akrokre festival is celebrated in Ghana in the southern part of the Ashanti region.
The chief of the town has to perform some sacrifices to mark the beginning of the festival.
During the festival, the local dish grounded dried cassava and pea nuts "Nkatiegari"

Festivals in Ghana
Religious festivals in Ghana